Puntsag-Ochiryn Pürevsüren (born 30 January 1975) is a Mongolian middle-distance runner. He competed in the men's 800 metres at the 2000 Summer Olympics, placing 56th.

References

External links
 

1975 births
Living people
Athletes (track and field) at the 2000 Summer Olympics
Mongolian male middle-distance runners
Olympic athletes of Mongolia
Place of birth missing (living people)
Athletes (track and field) at the 1998 Asian Games
Asian Games competitors for Mongolia
20th-century Mongolian people